The 741st Missile Squadron is a United States Air Force unit stationed at Minot Air Force Base, North Dakota. The squadron is equipped with the LGM-30G Minuteman III intercontinental ballistic missile, with a mission of nuclear deterrence.

The squadron was first activated as the 741st Bombardment Squadron in June 1943. After training in the United States with the Consolidated B-24 Liberator bombers, the 741st deployed to the Mediterranean Theater of Operations, participating in the strategic bombing campaign against Germany.   It earned two Distinguished Unit Citations for its combat operations.  Following V-E Day, it remained in Italy without its flight echelon until inactivating in September 1945

The squadron was activated in the reserve in 1947, but apparently was not fully manned or equipped before inactivating in June 1949 and transferring its resources to another unit.  It was redesignated the 741st Fighter-Day Squadron and activated, but did not become operational before inactivating in July 1957.  In November 1962 it was organized as the 741st Strategic Missile Squadron, an LGM-30B Minuteman I squadron. In 1971 it upgraded to the Minuteman III, and is currently a part of the 91st Operations Group.

Mission
The 741st Missile Squadron controls and maintains 50 launch facilities and 5 missile alert facilities.  The squadron is divided into missile operations flights, which are responsible for day-to-day operations, maintenance, and security, and an operations support flight, which is responsible for ensuring the readiness of the missile alert facilities.

History

World War II

Training in the United States
The squadron was first activated at Alamogordo Army Air Field, New Mexico on 1 June 1943 as the 741st Bombardment Squadron, one of the four squadrons of the 455th Bombardment Group. The initial cadre for the squadron was drawn from the 302d Bombardment Group. In July, a group cadre was given advanced tactical training by the Army Air Forces School of Applied Tactics at Orlando Army Air Base and Pinecastle Army Air Field, Florida. After organizing at Alamogordo, the squadron moved to Utah, where the ground echelon was stationed at Kearns Army Air Base, although flying operations were based at Salt Lake City Army Air Base. After completing training at Langley Field, Virginia, the squadron departed the United States for the Mediterranean Theater of Operations in December 1943. The air echelon began staging through Mitchel Field, New York to ferry their Liberators via the southern ferry route.

Combat operations

The air echelon of the squadron was delayed in Tunisia and was not entirely lodged at the squadron's combat station of San Giovanni Airfield, Italy until 1 February 1944, and the squadron flew its first mission that month.  The squadron was engaged primarily in the strategic bombing campaign against Germany, attacking targets like airfields, factories, oil refineries, harbors, marshalling yards in Italy, France, Germany, Austria, Hungary, Romania, and Yugoslavia.

On 2 April 1944, the squadron attacked a ball bearing plant at Steyr, Austria for which it earned a Distinguished Unit Citation (DUC).  The primary target, the Daimler-Pusch aircraft engine factory was obscured by clouds, so the unit attacked the nearby ball bearing plant although attacks by an estimated 75 twin engine fighters continued through the bomb run and heavy, accurate flak was encountered.  The squadron was the only one in the 455th Group not to suffer any losses in this operation.

On 26 June 1944, the squadron encountered fighter opposition that was described as the strongest Fifteenth Air Force had encountered to date, and which destroyed several Liberators of the 455th Group, which was leading the 304th Bombardment Wing on the raid.  The enemy fighters intensified their attacks on the squadron after they were able to separate the 741st from its fighter escort.  One squadron bomber was lost when a Luftwaffe fighter dove head on into it.  The Liberator continued on the bomb run and dropped its bombs on the target before crashing into the ground. Other fighters continued their attacks to within 100 feet of the squadron's planes.  The squadron pressed its attack on an oil refinery at Moosbierbaum, Austria, for which it received a second DUC.

The squadron provided air support to ground forces in Operation Shingle, the landings at Anzio and the Battle of Monte Cassino in the spring of 1944.  It knocked out coastal defenses to clear the way for Operation Dragoon, the invasion of southern France in September.  As Axis forces were withdrawing from the Balkan peninsula in the fall of 1944, the squadron bombed marshalling yards, troop concentrations and airfields to slow their retreat.  It flew air interdiction missions to support Operation Grapeshot, the Spring 1945 offensive in Northern Italy.

The squadron flew its last combat mission on 25 April 1945 against rail yards at Linz, Austria. Following the surrender of German forces in Italy, it flew some supply missions and transported personnel to ports and airfields for shipment back to the United States.  Most of the air echelon returned to the United States, ferrying their aircraft in June.   Many of the squadron's remaining personnel were transferred to other units in the 304th Bombardment Wing for shipment back to the United States, while the squadron remained in Italy, serving as a replacement depot.  The last of the air echelon departed Italy in July and the squadron was inactivated on 9 September 1945.

Air Force reserve
The squadron was reactivated as a reserve unit under Air Defense Command (ADC) at Hensley Field, Texas in June 1947, where its training was supervised by ADC's 4122d AAF Base Unit (later the 2596th Air Force Reserve Training Center).  It was nominally a very heavy bomber unit, but the squadron does not appear to have been fully manned or equipped while a reserve unit. In 1948 Continental Air Command (ConAC) assumed responsibility for managing reserve and Air National Guard units from ADC. President Truman's reduced 1949 defense budget required reductions in the number of units in the Air Force. ConAC also reorganized its reserve units under the wing base organization system in June 1949.  As a result, the squadron was inactivated and its personnel and equipment were absorbed by elements of the 443d Troop Carrier Wing, which was activated simultaneously.

Tactical Air Command
The squadron was redesignated the 741st Fighter-Day Squadron and activated at Myrtle Beach Air Force Base, South Carolina in July 1956 as Tactical Air Command planned to organize a second North American F-100 Super Sabre wing there.  Some personnel were assigned to the unit, but it never became operational with aircraft.   It was inactivated in July 1957 and its few personnel assigned were reassigned to elements of the 354th Fighter-Day Wing.

Intercontinental ballistic missile squadron

The squadron was redesignated the 741st Strategic Missile Squadron and activated on 1 December 1962 as an intercontinental ballistic missile squadron at Minot Air Force Base, North Dakota.  The squadron was initially equipped with 50 LGM-30B Minuteman Is, and placed its first missile on alert in 1963.   The 741st upgraded to the LGM-30G Minuteman III and on 19 August 1970 was the first unit to place a Minuteman III on alert status. It has maintained ICBMs on alert ever since.

The squadron has undergone several changes in assignment that did not affect its mission.  In June 1968, the 455th Strategic Missile Wing at Minot was replaced by the 91st Strategic Missile Wing, which moved from Glasgow Air Force Base, Montana to Minot on paper, and the squadron was reassigned to the 91st Wing. In September 1991 Strategic Air Command (SAC) reorganized its combat wings under the combat wing organization, and the 91st Wing's missile squadrons were assigned to the reactivated 91st Operations Group. In 1992, the Air Force reorganized its combat forces.  SAC was inactivated and the squadron became an element of Air Combat Command until July 1993, when it became part of Air Force Space Command. Between 1994 and 1996, the wing was reduced to group level. In December 2009, the Air Force's nuclear capable missile units, including the 741st, were transferred to Air Force Global Strike Command.

Squadron missile sites are designated by flight, using one letter of the alphabet, followed by a number. The first site in each flight is No. 1 and designates the Missile Alert Facility, which consists of an above-ground structure plus an underground launch control center staffed by two officers. The launch facilities are numbered 2 through 11 and are connected to the launch control center by hardened intersite cables, which also interconnect flights. The 741st includes flights F through J.

The 741st became the first unit in Twentieth Air Force to operate the LCC NetLink computer system.  This system allows missile combat crew members access to remote monitoring systems (including security and weather monitoring systems), automated maintenance systems, training materials and other items on Minot's local area network while on alert. Prior to NetLink, no external communication systems, aside from telephone, was allowed into the launch control center.

Lineage
 Constituted as the 741st Bombardment Squadron (Heavy) on 14 May 1943
 Activated on 1 June 1943
 Redesignated 741st Bombardment Squadron, Heavy on 6 March 1944
 Inactivated on 9 September 1945
 Redesignated 741st Bombardment Squadron, Very Heavy on 27 May 1947
 Activated in the reserve on 26 June 1947
 Inactivated on 27 June 1949
 Redesignated 741st Fighter-Day Squadron on 7 May 1956
 Activated on 25 July 1956
 Inactivated on 1 July 1957
 Redesignated 741st Strategic Missile Squadron (ICBM-Minuteman) and activated on 26 June 1962 (not organized)
 Organized on 1 December 1962
 Redesignated 741st Missile Squadron on 1 September 1991

Assignments
 455th Bombardment Group, 1 June 1943 – 9 September 1945
 455th Bombardment Group, 26 June 1947 – 27 June 1949
 455th Fighter-Day Group, 25 July 1956 – 1 July 1957
 Strategic Air Command, 28 June 1962 (not organized)
 455th Strategic Missile Wing, 1 December 1962
 91st Strategic Missile Wing, 25 June 1968
 91st Operations Group, 1 September 1991
 91st Missile Group, 1 July 1994
 91st Operations Group, 1 February 1996 – present

Stations
 Alamogordo Army Air Field, New Mexico, 1 June 1943
 Kearns Army Air Base, Utah, 9 September 1943
 Langley Field, Virginia, 5 October – 13 December 1943
 San Giovanni Airfield, Italy, 15 January 1944 – 9 September 1945
 Hensley Field, Texas, 10 January 1947 – 27 June 1949
 Myrtle Beach Air Force Base, South Carolina, 25 July 1956 – 1 July 1957
 Minot Air Force Base, North Dakota, 1 November 1962 – present

Aircraft and missiles
 Consolidated B-24 Liberator, 1943–1945
 LGM-30B Minuteman I, 1963–1971
 LGM-30G Minuteman III, 1968–present

Awards and campaigns

See also

 List of United States Air Force missile squadrons
 List of United States Air Force fighter squadrons
 B-24 Liberator units of the United States Army Air Forces

References

Notes
 Explanatory notes

 Citations

Bibliography

External links
 5th Bomb Wing Public Affairs: Minot AFB Homepage
91st Missile Wing fact sheet

Military units and formations in North Dakota
741
Units and formations of Strategic Air Command